Leonidas Vokolos (born 31 August 1970) is a Greek professional football manager and former player, who is the current manager of Super League club Lamia.

Playing career
He started his career playing for Panionios. Afterwards, he was transferred to Greek giants Panathinaikos, where he won the Double in 2004. He then played for PAOK FC, Kallithea F.C. in Greece and APOP Kinyras Peyias in Cyprus.

Vokolos was known for his reliability in defence and his very good heading and jumping ability. He played as well for the Greece national football team.

Managerial career
As of May 2010, Vokolos is the coach of Greece's U-17 national team. As of 5 August 2011, Fernando Santos has appointed Vokolos as the assistant coach of the Greece national football team; he replaced Zisis Vryzas.

Honours
Panionios
 Greek Cup: 1997–98

References

1970 births
Living people
Greece international footballers
Panathinaikos F.C. players
Panionios F.C. players
APOP Kinyras FC players
PAOK FC players
Kallithea F.C. players
Super League Greece players
Cypriot First Division players
Cypriot Second Division players
Greek expatriate footballers
Expatriate footballers in Cyprus
Greek expatriate sportspeople in Cyprus
Greek expatriate sportspeople in the Czech Republic
Panathinaikos F.C. non-playing staff
Panegialios F.C. managers
PAE Kerkyra managers
Olympiacos Volos F.C. managers
Panionios F.C. managers
Kallithea F.C. managers
Association football defenders
Footballers from Athens
Greek footballers
Greek football managers